Richard McGough (1892 – 18 April 1917) was an English professional footballer who played in the Football League for Newcastle United as a centre half.

Personal life 
McGough served in the Royal Garrison Artillery during the First World War and was an acting bombardier when he died of wounds in France on 18 April 1917. He was buried in Feuchy British Cemetery.

Career statistics

References

1892 births
1917 deaths
Footballers from Carlisle, Cumbria
English footballers
English Football League players
Association football midfielders
British Army personnel of World War I
Royal Garrison Artillery soldiers
British military personnel killed in World War I
Carlisle United F.C. players
Newcastle United F.C. players